The Ministry of Planning and Finance (abbreviated MOPF; formerly the Ministry of Finance) administers Burma's monetary, fiscal policies and national planning.

Ministry of Planning and Finance is currently led by Win Shein who was appointed by SAC chairman Min Aung Hlaing.

Ministers responsible for Finance 
U Tin Tut, 1946-1947
Thakin Mya, 1947
U Tin Tut, 1947-1948
U Tin, 1948-1956
Bo Khin Maung Gale, 1956-1958
U Kyaw Min, 1958-1960
Thakin Tin, 1960-1962
San Yu, 1963-1972
U Lwin, 1972-1977
U Than Sein, 1977
U Tun Tin, 1977-1988
Maung Maung Khin, 1988-1989
David Oliver Abel, 1989-1992
Win Tin, 1992-1997
U Khin Maung Thein, December 1997 - February 2003
Hla Tun, February 2003 - August 2012
Win Shein, September 2012 - March 2016
Kyaw Win, March 2016 - May 2018
Soe Win, May 2018 - 1 February 2021
Win Shein, 1 February 2021 - incumbent

See also
 Cabinet of Burma

References

External links
 Official website

PlanningandFinance
Myanmar
Ministries established in 1948
1948 establishments in Burma
Finance in Myanmar